Cillorigo de Liébana is a municipality located within the autonomous community of Cantabria, Spain. According to the 2007 census, the city had a population of 1,179 inhabitants. Its capital is Tama.

Locations

References

External links
Cillorigo de Liébana - Cantabria 102 Municipios

Municipalities in Cantabria